Sibling Rivalry is the third album by the country rock group The Rowans. It is their second effort recorded as trio with Peter Rowan.

Track listing
 "Ooh My Love" (Chris Rowan) 4:30
 "Love Is" (Lorin Rowan, Dudley Glanz, Mark Stein)  4:10
 "Tired Hands" (Lorin Rowan, Peter Rowan) 5:07
 "If I Only Could" (Chris Rowan)  3:52
 "No Desanimes Amor" (Peter Rowan, Juanita West, Amanda Lynn, Woody West) 3:55
 "Ya Ba da Ba" (Chris Rowan) 2:52
 "Fire Dragon" (Chris Rowan, Lorin Rowan, Peter Rowan) 0:58
 "Mongolian Swamp/King's Men" (Lorin Rowan, Peter Rowan) 4:14
 "Joaquin Murrieta" (Peter Rowan) 8:29
 "Sword of Faith/Soldier of the Cross" (Lorin Rowan) 4:59

Personnel
 Peter Rowan - guitar, mandolin, vocals
 Chris Rowan - guitar, piano, vocals
 Lorin Rowan - guitar, vocals
 Joe Carroll - bass
 Wally Drogas - drums
 Bill Elliott - organ, piano
 K. Dudley Glanz - drums
 Richard Greene - violin
 Jim Hodder - drums
 Mark Stein - drums
Peter Walsh - bass

References

The Rowans albums
1976 albums
Albums produced by Richard Podolor
Asylum Records albums